Alfredo Manzi was an Italian art director. He designed the film sets on around forty productions during his career.

Selected filmography
 Assunta Spina (1915)
 The Lady of the Camellias (1915)
 Odette (1916)
 Fedora (1916)
 The Clemenceau Affair (1917)
 Tosca (1918)
 The Stronger Passion (1921)
 The Nude Woman (1922)
 The Silent Partner (1939)
 Angelica (1939)
 Kean (1940)
 Bridge of Glass (1940)
 Rita da Cascia (1943)

References

Bibliography
 Bayman, Louis. Directory of World Cinema: Italy. Intellect Books, 2011.

External links

Year of birth unknown
Year of death unknown
Italian art directors